Centrepoint was a commune in Albany, New Zealand, founded in 1977 by Herbert "Bert" Thomas Potter (1925–2012) and 36 others. The commune was created in the model of the therapeutic encounter groups popularised in the 1960s in California. At its largest, it was home to over 200 people.

On 25 April 1990, Potter was convicted of drug charges. In November 1992 Potter was sentenced to 7 years' jail after being convicted of 13 charges of indecently assaulting five girls between 1979 and 1984. Justice Blanchard said Potter had "systematically corrupted children for his own sexual pleasure and had abused the power and trust community members placed in him". On release Potter maintained he had done nothing wrong and that he still believed that "intimacy" and "exploration" between adults and children was natural and desirable. Six other male leaders (one of them Potter's son John) were convicted for assault on a minor, indecent assault, sexual assault on a minor or rape of a minor. Bert Potter died on 6 May 2012.

Drug use at the commune 
MDMA (ecstasy) was manufactured onsite in large quantities in allegedly the first large scale clandestine lab to be operated in New Zealand. There are also allegations in media reports that LSD and ketamine were also manufactured on the site and that 'bus loads' of members would travel to a farm owned by the community to gather ergot infested rye grass to be used in the making of LSD. Three members were convicted of charges relating to the supply, conspiracy to supply and attempted manufacture of the class B drug.

Recollections from members who were present at the time indicates that only MDMA was manufactured from sassafras oil (source of safole a precursor for MDMA), which at that time was readily available in bulk and only restricted in 1994. The LSD was most likely imported or obtained from local sources and the ketamine was diverted from veterinary sources by a resident vet.

The drugs were widely used by most members of the community in large groups, family units, or by people on their own to deepen the psychotherapy that was at the heart of Bert's teachings. Teenagers as young as 13 were allegedly pressured to partake by adult counsellors and some of the female teenagers report being given the drug in sessions with Bert specifically for his sexual gratification.

Impacts on Children and Young Persons 
A three-year study undertaken by Massey University's School of Psychology culminating in a 260-page report was released in May 2010. The study was commissioned by the New Zealand Communities Growth Trust that had been set up by a High Court order to manage the Centrepoint Community Growth Trust assets after the commune was disestablished in 2000.

Twenty nine men and women in their 20s, 30s and 40s (at the time of the study) who had spent at least part of their youth at the commune were interviewed about their experiences of growing up at Centrepoint, including how psychological manipulation, neglect, sexual abuse and drug taking affected them at the time and subsequently. About 300 children lived at the commune over the 22 years it operated.  The qualitative study, titled A Different Kind of Family: Retrospective accounts of growing up at Centrepoint, and implications for adulthood, contains testimonies from some of the 29 interviewees.

Most participants agreed it was common to have sex for the first time between the ages of 11 and 13. Boys "propositioned" by older women found it easier to resist, while sexually abused girls - some as young as 10 - were "idealised" as "being in touch with their loving".

Some of the key findings were:

 Centrepoint was an environment which potentially exposed children to a range of adverse circumstances that extended well beyond the widely reported sexual abuse. Drug use, psychological manipulation, parental neglect, witnessing abuse, corporal punishment, adult conflict, peer bullying and a parent's imprisonment were just some of the additional factors that may have impacted on them. 
 Negative impacts were psychological disorders, substance abuse problems, difficulties in intimate and family relationships, financial problems, lack of direction in education and career, fear of social stigma and, for some, uncertainty about their perception of reality.
 Different experiences, beliefs and coping strategies created a tendency towards factionalised perspectives about Centrepoint with some study participants arguing it was fundamentally abusive, and others that it was an ideal place to grow up.
 Stigmatised perceptions of Centrepoint were reported as being further sources of psychological distress.

There have been suggestions that the report was 'watered-down' by excluding some of the testimonial content because they would have been too hard to believe and had an impact on the reception of the report as a whole.

After Centrepoint 
In March 2000 the trust that owned the property was disestablished by order of The High Court of New Zealand, and all assets placed under administration by the newly formed New Zealand Communities Growth Trust.

The new trust then leased property to the New Community Group, made up of former Centrepoint members, who formed the Anahata Eco-village. By 2004, about 20 adults and 8 children were resident. In 2007 a group of artists took over the property on a short-term lease and renamed it as Kahikatea Eco-village and art-space.

On 17 December 2008 the Public Trust, as trustee for the New Zealand Community Growth Trust, announced the sale of the 7.6 hectare (19 acre) property and communal living buildings to The Prema Charitable Trust.

The site has been renamed Kawai Purapura Retreat Centre and is now the main campus for Wellpark College of Natural Therapies, owned by the Prema Charitable Trust.

Neither The Prema Charitable Trust or Wellpark College have any connections to the previous occupants.

References

Further reading
 Surviving Centrepoint by Rachel C King Random House Ltd., Auckland 2021)
 Inside Centrepoint by Len Oakes (Benton Ross Publishers Ltd., Auckland, 1986) 
A Different Kind of Family: Retrospective accounts of growing up at Centrepoint, and implications for adulthood (Massey University, 2010) Executive Summary, Full Report

External links
 Bert’s Labyrinth: Revisiting Centrepoint
Angie Documentary Film released July 2018 at the New Zealand International Film Festival.
New Zealand Communities Growth Trust provides charitable grants to support individuals disadvantaged by cults or spiritual communities in particular past residents of Centrepoint and their children.

North Shore, New Zealand
Communalism
Communes
Organisations based in Auckland